Octavia Handworth (1887–1978) was an American actress of Danish heritage during the silent film era. She was born Octavia Boas and was married to Harry Handworth(1878/or1882-1916) an actor, producer and film director who headed Excelsior Feature Film Co. and Gordon De Main(1886–1954) an actor. Most of her career was appearing in short films i.e. for Pathe, then Lubin however she made half a dozen feature films.

Selected filmography
How Rastus Gets His Turkey (1910)
The Girl from Arizona (1910) *short
The Cowboy's Sweetheart and the Bandit (1910) *short;unconfirmed
The Motor Fiend (1910)*short
The Gambler's End (1910) *short
The Path Forbidden (1914)
When Fate Leads Trump (1914)
In the Shadow (1915)
Too Much Bull (1915) *short
The Darkness Before Dawn (1915) *short
The Beast (1915) *short
The Great Ruby (1915)
The Son (1915) *short
The Inevitable Penalty (1915) *short
Sweeter Than Revenge (1915) *short
The City of Failing Light (1916)
The Greater Wrong (1916) *short
Puppets of Fate (1916) *short
Sowing the Wind (1916) *short
Persistency (1916) *short
The Weaker Strain (1916) *short
Trials of Souls (1916) *short
Expiation (1916) *short
The Lost Paradise (1916) *short
Race Suicide (1916)
Footlights (1921)
Love's Redemption (1921) – final film; not the Norma Talmadge film of like name

References

External links

kinotv

1887 births
1978 deaths
Actresses from New York City
American silent film actresses
20th-century American actresses